Some Like It Hot is a 1959 comedy film starring Marilyn Monroe and directed by Billy Wilder.

Some Like It Hot may also refer to:

Film and television 
Some Like It Hot (1939 film), a comedy starring Bob Hope
Some Like It Hot (2016 film), a Chinese romantic comedy
"Some Like It Hot", a Night Court episode
"Some Like It Hot", an episode of British children's show Chorlton and the Wheelies
"Some Like It Hot", an episode from Pokémon: Master Quest, the fifth season of the Pokémon anime

Music

Songs
"Some Like It Hot", a big band jazz song recorded Feb. 26, 1939 by Gene Krupa, vocal by Irene Daye 
"Some Like It Hot" (song), by Power Station
"Some Like It Hot", the title tune from the 1959 movie by Matty Malneck and I. A. L. Diamond 
"It's Hot (Some Like It Hot)", a track from Jay-Z's album Vol. 3... Life and Times of S. Carter
"Some Like It Hot", a 1956 song by rockabilly musician Sammy Masters
"Some Like It Hot", a song from the 1983 Coney Hatch album Outta Hand

Albums
Some Like It Hot (album), a 1959 album by jazz guitarist Barney Kessel
Some Like It Hot, an album by Lou McGarity

Literature 
Some Like It Hot (novel), by Zoey Dean
Some Like It Hot, a 2006 novel by Lori Wilde
"Some Like It Hot", a short story from Tales of the Vampires
"Some Like It Hot", a phrase in the popular 18th-century children's rhyme "Pease Porridge Hot"

Other arts, entertainment and media
Some Like It Hot (musical), a 2022 musical based on the Billy Wilder film

See also
"Some Like It Hoth", a 2009 episode of the television series Lost